Lake Uspaccocha or Uspaycocha (possibly from Quechua uspha, uchpha ash, rest of combustion, qucha lake, lagoon, "ash lake") is a lake in the Andes of Peru located in the Apurímac Region, Abancay Province, Abancay District. It is situated in the Ampay National Sanctuary, at 3750 meters above sea level, north of the city of Abancay.

References 

Lakes of Peru
Lakes of Apurímac Region